Dale "Digger" DeGray (born September 3, 1963) is a Canadian former ice hockey defenceman who played 153 games in the National Hockey League (NHL).  He was an eighth round selection, 182nd overall, of the Calgary Flames at the 1981 NHL Entry Draft and played for the Toronto Maple Leafs, Los Angeles Kings and Buffalo Sabres in addition to the Flames before settling into a long minor league career. Internationally, DeGray represented Canada on one occasion; he was a member of the bronze medal winning team at the 1995 World Championship. DeGray is currently the general manager of the Owen Sound Attack of the Ontario Hockey League (OHL) and was named the OHL Executive of the Year in 2010–11.

Playing career
The grandson of Canadian Lacrosse Hall of Famer Kelly DeGray, Dale played both hockey and lacrosse in his youth but turned his focus exclusively to hockey in his teens. He played three seasons of junior hockey for the Oshawa Generals of the Ontario Hockey League (OHL) between 1980 and 1983 where he established a reputation as a rugged defenceman.  DeGray scored 50 points in his third season, 1982–83, and added 14 more in the playoffs as the Generals won the J. Ross Robertson Cup as OHL champions.

The Calgary Flames selected him in the eighth round, 182nd overall at the 1981 NHL Entry Draft, and he began his professional career in 1983–84 with a 30-point season for the Colorado Flames of the Central Hockey League (CHL). He then spent the majority of three seasons in the American Hockey League (AHL) with the Moncton Golden Flames. He was named to the AHL second All-Star Team in 1984–85, and served as captain of the Golden Flames in 1985–86. DeGray appeared in one NHL game that season, making his NHL debut with Calgary on March 6, 1986, against the New York Rangers. He played a part-time role in Calgary in 1986–87; in 27 games with the Flames, DeGray scored six goals and seven assists.

Unable to land a consistent place with Calgary, the Flames traded DeGray to the Toronto Maple Leafs on September 17, 1987, in exchange for a fifth round draft pick. He spent the majority of the 1987–88 NHL season in Toronto where he had 24 points in 56 games and spent some time playing at forward. DeGray played only the one season in Toronto as he was claimed off waivers by the Los Angeles Kings. He played a career-high 63 games for the Kings in 1988–89 and posted 28 points with 97 penalties in minutes. After beginning the 1989–90 season with the AHL's New Haven Nighthawks, the Kings traded DeGray on November 24, 1989, to the Buffalo Sabres in exchange for Bob Halkidis. The six games he played in Buffalo were the last of his NHL career.

DeGray played most of two seasons with the AHL's Rochester Americans before spending the 1991–92 season in Italy with HC Alleghe. He returned to North America and played several seasons in the International Hockey League (IHL) for seven teams. He was named to the IHL second All-Star Team on two occasions: 1992–93 with the San Diego Gulls and 1994–95, split between the Detroit Vipers and Cleveland Lumberjacks.  In 1995, he also made his lone appearance with the Canadian national team. DeGray scored one goal and one assist in six games for the bronze medal-winning Canadians at the 1995 World Championship. DeGray's final season was 1998–99 when, as a member of the Indianapolis Ice, he suffered a career-ending shoulder injury in a December 10, 1998, game against the Orlando Solar Bears.

Coaching and management career
DeGray briefly turned to coaching, where he spent two seasons as the head coach of the United Hockey League's Rockford IceHogs between 1999 and 2001. He led the team to a combined 62–72–14 record in that time. Since 2007, he has been the general manager of the OHL's Owen Sound Attack. DeGray was named the OHL's Executive of the Year in 2010–11 after guiding the Attack to a franchise-best 46–17–5 record, a J. Ross Robertson Cup championship and a place in the 2011 Memorial Cup tournament.

Career statistics

Regular season and playoffs

International

References

External links
 

1963 births
Buffalo Sabres players
Calgary Flames draft picks
Calgary Flames players
Canadian ice hockey defencemen
Cincinnati Cyclones (IHL) players
Cleveland Lumberjacks players
Colorado Flames players
Detroit Vipers players
Florida Panthers scouts
Ice hockey people from Ontario
Indianapolis Ice players
Living people
Los Angeles Kings players
Manitoba Moose (IHL) players
Moncton Golden Flames players
New Haven Nighthawks players
Newmarket Saints players
Oshawa Generals players
Quebec Rafales players
Rochester Americans players
San Diego Gulls (IHL) players
Sportspeople from Oshawa
Toronto Maple Leafs players